Canal+ Sport is a Polish channel specializing in sport.

Canal+ Sport HD 
In 2008 a high-definition version of the channel, Canal+ Sport HD was launched. It is available via satellite NC+ and various cable platforms. Canal+ Sport HD features Golf, Basketball, Handball, and Soccer amongst other programs.

See also 
 Canal+ Gol (Poland)

References 

Television channels in Poland
Sports television in Poland
Canal+ Premium
Television channels and stations established in 1998